Southwark Borough Football Club was a football club based in the London Borough of Southwark, England.

History
Founded in 1975 as Southwark Sports, the club initially played Sunday league football. In 1982, the club joined the London Spartan League, reaching the Premier Division in 1984. In 1988, the club changed name to Southwark Borough, a year after the club entered the FA Vase for the first time. After a ninth-placed finish in the 1988–89 Spartan League, Southwark Borough were ejected from the league following breaking misconduct rules. The club folded on 3 April 1990, after a failed attempt to gain admission to the Essex Senior League.

Ground
The club initially played at Southwark Sports Ground in Dulwich. In 1988, Southwark Borough entered a groundsharing agreement with Fisher Athletic at their Surrey Docks Stadium. The groundshare was terminated at the end of the season, following Southwark's expulsion from the Spartan League. Southwark later secured a pitch in Kidbrooke, before folding due to not having a league to compete in.

Records
Best FA Vase performance: First round, 1988–89
Record attendance: 325 vs Fisher Athletic, Spartan League, 3 April 1989

References

External links

Defunct football clubs in England
Spartan League
Association football clubs established in 1975
1975 establishments in England
Association football clubs disestablished in 1990
Defunct football clubs in London
1990 disestablishments in England
Sport in the London Borough of Southwark